Sunisa "Suni" Lee (born Sunisa Phabsomphou; March 9, 2003) is a Hmong American artistic gymnast. She is the 2020 Olympic all-around champion and uneven bars bronze medalist. She was a member of the teams that won gold at the 2019 World Championships and silver at the 2020 Summer Olympics. Lee is a six-time member of the U.S. women's national gymnastics team and is the first Hmong-American Olympian. With six world championship and Olympic medals, she is tied with Gabby Douglas, Kim Zmeskal, Kyla Ross, and Rebecca Bross as the tenth most decorated American female gymnast.

== Personal life ==
Sunisa Lee was born Sunisa Phabsomphou on March 9, 2003, in Saint Paul, Minnesota, to Yeev Thoj, a healthcare worker. Lee is of Hmong descent, and her mother, a refugee, immigrated to the United States from Laos as a child. Lee was raised by her mother's longtime partner, John Lee, from the age of two.  Lee considers John to be her father, and she began using his surname professionally as a teenager. She has three half-siblings, Evionn, Lucky, and Noah, through her mother's relationship with Lee, and Lee had two children, Jonah and Shyenne, from a previous relationship. Evionn also competed in artistic gymnastics at the regional level.

At six years old, Lee started gymnastics at the Midwest Gymnastics Center in Little Canada, Minnesota, a St. Paul suburb. The following year, Lee began competing and won the all-around at a state meet, the second meet of her career. At age eight, she moved up three levels. She qualified for elite at age 11. From six to 12 years old, Lee was trained by Punnarith Koy at Midwest Gymnastics.

In August 2019, just days before Lee competed in her first senior USA Gymnastics National Championships, her father fell off of a ladder while helping a friend, leaving him paralyzed from the waist down. The following year, Lee's aunt and uncle died from COVID-19. When discussing these tragedies, Lee said, "I am tougher because of it."

In 2021, Lee was included on the Time 100, Times annual list of the 100 most influential people in the world.

In November 2021, she said that she was pepper-sprayed in a racial incident while in Los Angeles for her stint on Dancing with the Stars. In January 2022, she responded in the comment section of  a TikTok video about facing racial comments from her own Hmong-American community for expressing her interracial relationship with USC Trojans football player Jaylin Smith.

Gymnastics career

Junior

2015–2017 
Lee competed in the Hopes division in 2015 and became a junior elite in 2016. She made her junior elite debut at the 2016 U.S. Classic.

In 2017, she made the junior national team and made her international debut at the Gymnix International Junior Cup, where the US won the gold medal in the team event and Lee won the silver medal on uneven bars. In May 2017, Lee announced her verbal commitment to Auburn University on a gymnastics scholarship.

2018
Lee was named to the team to compete at the 2018 Pacific Rim Gymnastics Championships. There, she won the gold medal with the U.S. team in the team final and won the silver medal on vault, balance beam, and floor exercise. She finished 4th in the all-around.   The following month, an ankle injury forced Lee to withdraw from the Pan American Junior Championships in Buenos Aires, Argentina.

On July 28, Lee competed at the 2018 U.S. Classic where she finished fifth in the all-around. She won the gold medal on balance beam despite not doing a dismount.  Lee competed in August at the 2018 U.S. National Championships in Boston as one of the favorites for the junior national title along with Leanne Wong, Jordan Bowers, and Kayla DiCello. She won the bronze medal in the all-around behind Wong and DiCello and won the gold medal on the uneven bars.

Senior

2019
In February, USA Gymnastics announced that Lee would make her senior debut at the 2019 City of Jesolo Trophy. There, she won the gold medal in the all-around and helped the U.S. win the gold medal in the team final. She also won the gold medal on bars and floor, as well as the bronze medal on beam behind reigning World Champion Liu Tingting of China and teammate Emma Malabuyo.

The following month, Lee injured her ankle, and in June, she sustained a hairline fracture to her left tibia while practicing a balance beam dismount.

Later that month, Lee competed at the American Classic on only bars and beam. She placed second on beam and fifth on bars after falling off twice. After the conclusion of the American Classic, Lee was named as one of the eight athletes being considered for the team to compete at the 2019 Pan American Games along with Sloane Blakely, Kara Eaker, Aleah Finnegan, Morgan Hurd, Shilese Jones, Riley McCusker, and Leanne Wong.

At the 2019 GK US Classic, Lee opted to only compete bars and beam, where she placed second and tied for eighth, respectively. She was not named to the Pan-American Games team.

At the 2019 U.S. National Championships, Lee competed all four events on the first day of competition and was in second place in the all-around behind Simone Biles and in first place on uneven bars. On the second day of competition, she continued performing clean routines and ended up winning the silver medal in the all-around behind Biles. She also won the gold medal on bars ahead of Morgan Hurd and Biles, placed fourth on beam behind Biles, Kara Eaker, and Leanne Wong, and won the bronze medal on floor behind Biles and Jade Carey. As a result, she was named a member of the national team.

In September, Lee competed at the US World Championships trials, where she placed second in the all-around behind Simone Biles, losing by only 0.350 points. The following day she was named to the team to compete at the 2019 World Championships in Stuttgart alongside Biles, Kara Eaker, MyKayla Skinner, Jade Carey, and Grace McCallum. She was the only first-year senior named to the team and the only team member without prior World Championships experience.

During the qualification round at the World Championships, Lee helped the USA qualify to the team final in first place, over five points ahead of second place China. Individually, Lee qualified to the all-around final in second place behind teammate Biles despite a fall on the balance beam. She also qualified in second place behind Biles to the floor exercise final, beating out teammate Carey in a tiebreaker, and to the uneven bars final in third place behind reigning World Champion Nina Derwael of Belgium and 2015 World Champion Daria Spiridonova of Russia. Even with the fall on beam, Lee also would have qualified as a reserve for the balance beam finals, but was excluded by the two-per-country rule, as Biles and Eaker had both qualified in higher positions.

In the team final of the World Championships, Lee competed on uneven bars, balance beam, and floor exercise and helped the USA win the gold medal ahead of Russia and Italy. Although she fell again on balance beam, her score on uneven bars (14.733) was the third highest of the day, as was her score on floor exercise (14.233). In the all-around final, Lee finished in eighth place after an uncharacteristic fall from the uneven bars. In the uneven bars final, Lee performed a clean routine and earned a score of 14.800, winning the bronze medal behind Derwael and Becky Downie. The following day, she competed in the floor final and won the silver medal behind Biles.

2020
In late January, it was announced that Lee would compete at the Stuttgart World Cup taking place in March.  The Stuttgart World Cup was later canceled due to the COVID-19 pandemic in Germany.

Later that year, Lee spent two months recovering from a broken bone in her left foot, as well as two months recovering from an Achilles tendon injury. Lee did not compete for the remainder of the season due to the pandemic. In November, Lee signed her National Letter of Intent with Auburn University.

2021 
In February, Lee returned to competition at the 2021 Winter Cup, where she competed on bars and beam. She placed first on bars and third on beam, behind Skye Blakely and Jordan Chiles, even though she used a relatively low-scoring layout dismount.  In April, Lee competed at the American Classic on the floor exercise, uneven bars, and balance beam, placing first on the latter two with scores of 15.200 and 14.550. She placed fifth on floor despite using a simple layout for two of her tumbling passes. In May, Lee competed at the U.S. Classic on the uneven bars and balance beam. She fell off both and placed tenth and eighth respectively. Lee was one of five gymnasts featured on the Peacock docuseries Golden: The Journey of USA's Elite Gymnasts.

In June, Lee competed at the 2021 National Championships. During the first day of competition, Lee executed an uneven bars routine of 6.8 difficulty, scoring 15.3. Lee finished the competition second in the all-around behind Simone Biles, first on the uneven bars, and second on the balance beam. This qualified her to compete at the upcoming Olympic Trials.

On the first night of the Olympic Trials, Lee performed all four routines, with an uneven bars score of 15.300, and ended the night in second place behind Biles. On the second night of competition, she scored a combined 58.166 on day two, higher than Biles' 57.533. This was the only third time in Biles' senior career, and the first time since 2013, when someone else posted a higher one-day all-around score. However, Lee's two-day combined score was less than Biles' and she finished the competition in second place, automatically qualifying for the Olympic team alongside Biles. Also named to the team were Jordan Chiles and Grace McCallum.

2020 Olympics 
At the Olympic Games, Lee performed the all-around during qualifications and helped the USA qualify to the team final in second place behind the Russian Olympic Committee.  She hit all four of her routines and finished in third place overall behind Simone Biles and Rebeca Andrade and advanced to the final.  Additionally, she advanced to the uneven bars final in second place behind Nina Derwael and the balance beam final in third behind Guan Chenchen and Tang Xijing.

During the team final, Lee was initially set to compete only on uneven bars and balance beam. However, Biles withdrew from the competition after the first rotation and Lee replaced her on floor exercise.  She hit all three of her routines, including her uneven bars routine which scored 15.400 (tying the highest mark of the competition in any event), and helped the United States finish second behind the Russian Olympic Committee.

During the all-around final, Lee hit all four of her routines to win the gold medal, surpassing Brazil's Rebeca Andrade and ROC's Angelina Melnikova. She is the sixth American champion in the event following Mary Lou Retton, Carly Patterson, Nastia Liukin, Gabby Douglas, and Simone Biles, and the first Asian champion of any nationality.

During the uneven bars final, Lee was the first competitor to go. She uncharacteristically failed to connect several elements and scored a 14.500; despite this, she won the bronze medal.  During the balance beam final, Lee placed fifth with a score of 13.866, after a large balance check on one of her elements.

In honor of her historic Olympic success, the governor of Minnesota, Tim Walz, as well as the mayor of St. Paul, Melvin Carter, declared Friday, July 30, 2021, to be "Sunisa Lee Day".  In October Lee was one of the recipients of the Asia Game Changer Award for "competing with grace under pressure and making Olympic history".

NCAA

2021–2022 season 
Lee made her NCAA debut on January 7 in a tri-meet against North Carolina and Bowling Green. She competed on uneven bars and balance beam to help Auburn win the meet.  The following week, Lee debuted her floor exercise routine in a meet against Arkansas. Lee made her all-around debut on January 28 in a meet against Alabama.  She earned a score of 39.700 to help Auburn win the meet; Lee won the all-around title outright and co-won the titles on the uneven bars and balance beam.  As a result, Lee was named SEC freshman of the week for the first time.  On February 5, in a meet against LSU, Lee earned her first collegiate perfect ten on the uneven bars.  It was the sixth perfect ten scored by an Auburn gymnast and first since 2004. Lee also won the all-around with a score of 39.825.  On February 25, in a meet against Kentucky, Lee earned her first perfect ten on the balance beam and became the first collegiate gymnast to perform a Nabieva on the uneven bars.  At the NCAA Championship, Lee finished first on balance beam and second in the all-around behind Trinity Thomas.

2022–2023 season 
On November 15, 2022, Lee announced that the 2022–2023 season would be her final season competing for Auburn University so that she can return to elite gymnastics with the goal of competing at the 2024 Olympic Games in Paris.

Lee's first meet of the season was at the inaugural Super 16 event in Las Vegas, where she won the balance beam title with a perfect 10 as well as the all-around title with a 39.75.

Career perfect 10.0

Television roles and media appearances

Dancing with the Stars
A few months after the 2020 Olympic Games Lee competed on season 30 of Dancing with the Stars.  She was the seventh Olympic gymnast to be a contestant following Shawn Johnson, Nastia Liukin, Aly Raisman, Laurie Hernandez, Simone Biles, and Mary Lou Retton.  During the premiere episode it was revealed that her partner was Sasha Farber, the same professional Biles and Retton were partnered with.  Lee was eliminated during week 9 of the competition, finishing in 5th place.

Performances

Selected competitive skills

Competitive history

Awards

Filmography

See also 

 History of the Hmong in Minneapolis–Saint Paul

References 

2003 births
Living people
American female artistic gymnasts
American people of Hmong descent
Sportspeople from Saint Paul, Minnesota
U.S. women's national team gymnasts
Medalists at the World Artistic Gymnastics Championships
Gymnasts at the 2020 Summer Olympics
Olympic gymnasts of the United States
Medalists at the 2020 Summer Olympics
Olympic gold medalists for the United States in gymnastics
Olympic silver medalists for the United States in gymnastics
Olympic bronze medalists for the United States in gymnastics
Auburn Tigers women's gymnasts
NCAA gymnasts who have scored a perfect 10
Asia Game Changer Award winners